Creen v Wright (1875–76) LR 1 CPD 591 is an English contract law and labour law case concerning wrongful dismissal and the appropriate period of reasonable notice to be implied at common law in a contract of employment.

Facts
Mr. Creen was a master mariner, in command of Mr. Wright's ship under a written agreement. This said,

“I hereby accept the command of the ship City Camp on the following terms: Salary to be at and after the rate of 180l. sterling per annum... Should owners require captain to leave the ship abroad, his wages to cease on the day he is required to give up the command, and the owners have the option of paying or not paying his expenses travelling home... Wages to begin when captain joins the ship.”

Mr. Creen had arrived at Liverpool and discharged some cargo. More was loaded on when on 10 August 1875 Mr. Wright without notice or justifiable cause, purported to dismiss Mr. Creen. He argued that Mr. Creen was not entitled to any notice.

The first instance just agreed that without any evidence of custom of notice periods in the trade (as there was with clerks and servants) Mr. Creen was not entitled to notice. He appealed. The submissions of counsel were reported as follows.

Judgment
Lord Coleridge CJ held that Mr. Creen could not (except under unusual circumstances) be dismissed without a reasonable notice. He delivered the judgment of the court (Archibald LJ and Lindley LJ).

See also
Employment at will

Notes

United Kingdom labour case law
English implied terms case law
Lord Lindley cases
1876 in case law
1876 in British law